Ashley Brooke Moody (born March 28, 1975) is an American attorney and politician serving as the Florida attorney general since January 2019. Moody previously served as an assistant U.S. attorney and a circuit court judge in Hillsborough County.

During her tenure as Florida attorney general, Moody has supported lawsuits to invalidate the Affordable Care Act, advocated against restoration of voting rights for former felons, and opposed the legalization of recreational marijuana. Moody was a significant surrogate of then-President Donald Trump in Florida during the 2020 presidential election, and joined in the Texas v. Pennsylvania lawsuit, which sought to overturn the results of the election.

Early life and education 
Moody was born in Plant City, Florida, on March 28, 1975. She is the oldest of three children born to Carol and Judge James S. Moody Jr.

Moody graduated from Plant City High School in 1993. She received a bachelor's degree and master's degree in accounting from University of Florida. While attending the University of Florida, she served as president of Florida Blue Key. Moody earned a Master of Laws in international law from Stetson University College of Law, and her Juris Doctor from the University of Florida School of Law.

Early career 
Moody interned for Martha Barnett, the president of the American Bar Association, and later joined the law firm Holland & Knight, working in civil litigation.

In January 1998, Moody switched her party affiliation from Democratic to Republican. Upon his election, Florida governor Jeb Bush appointed her to be the student representative on the Board of Regents, a now-defunct body that ran the state's university system.

Moody was appointed an assistant U.S. attorney for the Middle District of Florida. In 2006, Moody was elected to the Thirteenth Judicial Circuit Court of Florida, which consisted of Hillsborough County.

Florida Attorney General

Elections 
On April 28, 2017, Moody resigned from the court to run for Florida Attorney General in the 2018 election. In the Republican primary, Moody defeated state representative Frank White, who attacked Moody for her prior registration as a Democrat. In the general election, Moody defeated Democratic nominee Sean Shaw, a state representative, with 52% of the vote to Shaw's 46%.

Moody was reelected in the 2022 election against Democratic nominee Aramis Ayala, winning by a margin of approximately 20%.

Tenure

Health care 
Moody kept Florida in a lawsuit that seeks to have the Affordable Care Act deemed unconstitutional.

Michael Flynn 
In May 2020, Moody urged the federal government to drop its case against Trump associate Michael Flynn who had pleaded guilty to lying to the FBI.

Marijuana 
Moody opposes the legalization of recreational marijuana. In April 2021, following a pending 2022 ballot initiative to legalize recreational marijuana in Florida, Moody asked the Florida Supreme Court to review whether the initiative was suitable for the 2022 election. 

The Florida Supreme Court ruled with a 5-2 majority that the wording of the proposed amendment was "misleading" because the initiative (which cannot be longer than 75 words) did not specify that recreational marijuana would still be illegal at the federal level. This effectively killed the ballot initiative by forcing the organizers, Make It Legal Florida, to have to redraft the amendment and recollect signatures.

Voting rights 
Moody opposes the restoration of voting rights for former felons. Following the passing of Voting Rights Restoration for Felons Initiative in 2018, Moody, along with Governor Ron DeSantis, helped push a bill through the Florida Senate that would only restore voting rights to eligible felons once the felon has paid all of their court fees. In September 2020, after billionaire Michael Bloomberg raised $16 million to pay 32,000 felons' court fees, which would make them eligible to vote in the 2020 elections, Moody asked the Federal Bureau of Investigation and the Florida Department of Law Enforcement to investigate Bloomberg, claiming he potentially violated election laws.

2020 presidential election 
During the 2020 presidential election, Politico described Moody as "one of Donald Trump's biggest surrogates" in Florida. After Joe Biden won the election and Trump refused to concede, Moody took a leading role in aiding Trump's attempts to overturn the election.

On December 9, 2020, Moody and 15 other state attorneys general announced their support for a lawsuit by Ken Paxton, the Texas attorney general, asking the Supreme Court of the United States to invalidate the presidential election results in Georgia, Michigan, Pennsylvania, and Wisconsin, which were all won by Biden. There was no evidence of large-scale fraud in the election, and the court decided 7-2 not to hear the Texas lawsuit.

Moody was on the board of directors for the Rule of Law Defense Fund. In January 2021, the organization encouraged the gathering at the Capitol building to call for a halt on the counting of the Electoral College ballots, which they believed to be fraudulent. After the pro-Trump mob stormed the Capitol, Moody removed any references to the Rule of Law Defense Fund from her online biography.

COVID-19 pandemic 
In 2021, amid the COVID-19 pandemic, Moody sued the federal government and the CDC for instituting requirements that cruise ships require 95% of cruise passengers to be fully vaccinated to sail.

Personal life 
Moody is married to Justin Duralia, a Drug Enforcement Administration special agent. They have two sons together. Their elder son is serving in the United States Army.

Electoral history

References

External links 

1975 births
21st-century American judges
21st-century American lawyers
21st-century American politicians
21st-century American women politicians
American prosecutors
Florida Attorneys General
Florida Republicans
Florida state court judges
Living people
People from Plant City, Florida
Stetson University College of Law alumni
Warrington College of Business alumni
Fredric G. Levin College of Law alumni
Women in Florida politics
21st-century American women lawyers
21st-century American women judges